The 1901–02 season was Manchester City F.C.'s eleventh season of league football and third consecutive season in the First Division of the Football League. It was also the first year in which the club suffered relegation from a division of league football.

Football League First Division

Results summary

Reports

FA Cup

Squad statistics

Squad
Appearances for competitive matches only

Scorers

All

League

FA Cup

See also
Manchester City F.C. seasons

References

External links
Extensive Manchester City statistics site

1901-02
English football clubs 1901–02 season